Lieutenant General Sir Ralph William Wooddisse,  (born 8 January 1970) is a British Army officer who serves as Commander Field Army since April 2021.

Early life and education
Wooddisse was born on 8 January 1970 in Dhekelia, Cyprus. He was educated at Denstone College, a private school in Staffordshire, England. He studied at University College London and underwent officer training at the Royal Military Academy Sandhurst.

Military career

Wooddisse was commissioned into the Royal Anglian Regiment on 3 September 1989. He was awarded the Military Cross (MC) on 20 October 1999 in recognition of gallant and distinguished services during operations in Kosovo between January and June that year. He later served as a company commander in Iraq during the Iraq War, was appointed Member of the Order of the British Empire (MBE) in the 2007 Birthday Honours, and became commanding officer of the 2nd Battalion, the Royal Anglian Regiment in March 2009.

Wooddisse went on to be Assistant Head, Military Strategic Plans at the Ministry of Defence in May 2012, commander of 38th (Irish) Brigade in November 2013, and General Officer Commanding 1st (United Kingdom) Division in May 2017. Wooddisse was appointed Commander of the Order of the British Empire (CBE) in the 2017 Birthday Honours, and appointed Assistant Chief of the General Staff in November 2018. He was promoted to lieutenant general and became Commander Field Army on 19 April 2021.

Wooddisse was appointed Knight Commander of the Order of the Bath (KCB) in the 2022 Birthday Honours.

Personal life
In 2000, Wooddisse married Louise. Together they have three daughters.

References

|-

|-

1970 births
Alumni of University College London
British Army generals
British Army personnel of the Iraq War
British Army personnel of the War in Afghanistan (2001–2021)
British military personnel of The Troubles (Northern Ireland)
Commanders of the Order of the British Empire
Knights Commander of the Order of the Bath
Living people
NATO personnel in the Bosnian War
Recipients of the Military Cross
People educated at Denstone College
Royal Anglian Regiment officers